Opus De Funk or Opus de Funk may refer to:

Opus De Funk (album), a studio album by Johnny "Hammond" Smith
"Opus de Funk" (composition), a jazz standard composed by Horace Silver